Giblets  is a culinary term for the edible offal of a fowl, typically including the heart, gizzard, liver, and other organs.

A whole bird from a butcher is often packaged with the giblets, sometimes sealed in a bag within the body cavity. The neck is often included with the giblets; in the West it is usually separated from the body during butchering.

There are a number of recipes that use giblets. If a bird is to be stuffed, the giblets are traditionally chopped and added to the stuffing; however, the USDA recommends cooking giblets separately from the rest of the bird. If not, they can be used for other purposes, such as giblet pie or, a Southern U.S. favorite, giblet gravy.  With the exception of giblet gravy, the liver is not usually included in these recipes, as its strong flavor tends to overpower other ingredients. It may be used in liver-specific recipes, such as pâté or yakitori. Giblets can also be used to make alicot, a French stew.

In Turkish cuisine, iç pilav is a traditional pilaf dish, made with rice, chicken liver, nuts, and spices. Jerusalem mixed grill is an Israeli delicacy made with giblets, usually eaten with pita bread.

In Gorkha cuisine, giblets are cooked with chili pepper and tomato and relished as a side dish or appetizer known as karchi marchi.

In his 19th century culinary dictionary, Alexander Dumas defines giblets as "the comb and kidneys of the rooster, the wing tips of hens, the spinal marrow, gizzard, and neck of the turkey, calves' sweetbreads and brains". They can be made as a standalone dish with beef marrow bouillon, mushrooms, artichoke, truffles (when in season) and celery. This giblet dish can be served as a casserole with rice, or used as a filling for the pastry vol-au-vent. This was considered daily fare, and not intended for special occasions.

Most poultry, especially those sold in supermarkets, is not sold with the giblets included.  Giblets can be bought separately from a butcher, but the demand for human consumption is low in most Western countries, so they are more often sold to pet food manufacturers.

References

External links

 USDA Giblets fact sheet
 

Offal
Poultry products